Ole Henrik Grønn (born 22 September 1984) is a Norwegian politician, formerly of the Christian Democratic Party.

He served as a deputy representative to the Norwegian Parliament from Østfold during the term 2005–2009. He was also a member of Sarpsborg municipal council.

In 2008, he received national attention when he came out as gay, and left the Christian Democratic Party. He did not immediately join another party, but rather continued as an independent.

References

Deputy members of the Storting
Christian Democratic Party (Norway) politicians
Østfold politicians
People from Sarpsborg
Gay politicians
Norwegian LGBT politicians
1984 births
Living people
LGBT legislators
LGBT conservatism
21st-century Norwegian politicians